Charles Jonker (13 December 1933 – 31 July 1991) was a South African cyclist. He competed at the 1956 Summer Olympics and 1960 Summer Olympics.

References

External links
 

1933 births
1991 deaths
South African male cyclists
Olympic cyclists of South Africa
Cyclists at the 1956 Summer Olympics
Cyclists at the 1960 Summer Olympics
Sportspeople from Port Elizabeth
Commonwealth Games competitors for South Africa
Cyclists at the 1958 British Empire and Commonwealth Games